Dynamic apnea is a discipline of competitive freediving, also known as competitive apnea. Dynamic apnea covers two of the eight competitive freediving categories recognised by the AIDA International (International Association for Development of Apnea): dynamic with fins (DYN) and dynamic without fins (DNF). Both disciplines require breath held dives where the diver travels in a horizontal position under water under their own power without aid/physical contact of a static surface, with the exception of the pool wall when done indoors. The records can only be recognized in pools of 25m or greater.

When diving in the dynamic without fins category, divers will usually prefer the shorter 25m pools, so they can take advantage of the wall-kick. However, when diving in the dynamic with fins category, divers will usually prefer the longer 50m pools, so the wall-turn will not slow them down.

The other categories recognized are: static apnea, no limit, variable weight, free immersion, constant weight, constant weight without fins,

Sources 
AIDA – Association Internationale pour le Développement de l'Apnée

References

External links
, June 28, 2013
, November 3, 2019

Competitive apnea disciplines